CMN may refer to:

 Canadian Museum of Nature, in Canada's National Capital Region
 Carmarthen railway station, Wales, station code CMN
 Catholic Media Network, Philippines radio network
 Centre des monuments nationaux, French heritage agency
 Certificate of medical necessity, in American healthcare
 Children's Miracle Network Hospitals, in the U.S. and Canada
 College of Menominee Nation, in Wisconsin, U.S.
 Common Music Notation, open source musical notation software
 Constructions Mécaniques de Normandie, a shipyard in Cherbourg, France 
 Mohammed V International Airport, Casablanca, Morocco, IATA code CMN
 Mandarin Chinese, ISO 639-3 language code cmn

See also
 Carmarthenshire, county in Wales